The Satsuma Peninsula (薩摩半島 Satsuma-hantō) is a peninsula which projects south from the southwest part of Kyūshū Island, Japan. To the west lies the East China Sea, while to the east it faces the Ōsumi Peninsula across Kagoshima Bay. Politically, it belongs to Kagoshima Prefecture, and it includes the prefectural capital, Kagoshima City. Near the southern tip of the peninsula is the  Mount Kaimon (Kaimon-dake) and the hot springs of Ibusuki Onsen.

References 

Landforms of Kagoshima Prefecture
Peninsulas of Japan
Satsuma Province